The Salish Wool Dog or Comox dog is an extinct breed of white, long-haired, Spitz-type dog that was developed and bred by the Coast Salish peoples of what is now Washington state and British Columbia. The small, long-haired wool dog and the coyote-like village dogs were deliberately maintained as separate populations. The dogs were kept in packs of about 12 to 20 animals, and fed primarily raw and cooked salmon. To keep the breed true to type and the preferred white color, Salish Wool Dogs were confined on islands and in gated caves.

The fur of the Salish Wool Dog was prized for making the famous and rare "Salish" blankets, as the Salish peoples did not have sheep and wild mountain goat wool was difficult to gather. The dogs were sheared like sheep in May or June. The sheared fur was so thick that Captain George Vancouver could pick up a corner and the whole fleece would hold together. Ceremonial blankets were prized items in the pre-contact potlatch distribution economic system, almost as valuable as slaves. The dog hair was frequently mixed with mountain goat wool, feathers, and plant fibers to change the yarn quality and to extend the supply of fiber.

The National Museum of Natural History received a specimen of the Salish Wool Dog in 1859, which remains in their collection after being rediscovered in 2003.

Osteometry 
 Skull total length: 
 Condylobasal skull length: 
 Femur GL: 
 Tibia GL: 
 Humerus GL: 
 Radius GL: 
 Ulna GL: 
 Shoulder height of standing dog:

References

External links
 Woolly Dogs at All Fiber Arts
 Native Dog Types in North America
 Solazzo, C., S. Heald, M.W. Ballard, D.A. Ashford, P.T. DePriest, R.J. Koestler, and M. Collins. 2011. Proteomics and Coast Salish blankets: A tale of shaggy dogs?  Antiquity 85: 1418-1432
 Barsh, Russel L., Joan Megan Jones, and Wayne Suttles, 2002. “History, Ethnography, and Archaeology of the Coast Salish Woolly-Dog.” In Snyder, L.M. and E.A. Moore, eds., Dogs and People in Social, Working, Economic or Symbolic Interaction. Proceedings of the 9th Conference of the International Council of Archaeozoolog y 1–11. Oxbow Books, Durham, UK
 Traci Watson, Native American Blankets Made With Dog Hair by Science, 23 Nov. 2011

Extinct dog breeds of Canada
Dog breeds originating in North America
Dog breeds originating in the United States
Spitz breeds
Wool animals
Dog breeds originating from Indigenous Americans
Animal hair products